Petru Rareș is a commune in Bistrița-Năsăud County, Transylvania, Romania. It is composed of two villages, Bața (Baca) and Reteag (the commune centre;). It also included Ciceu-Mihăiești, Ciceu-Corabia and Lelești villages until 2005, when these were split off to form Ciceu-Mihăiești Commune.

Named after Petru Rareș (voivode of Moldavia in the 16th century), the commune lies on the Transylvanian Plateau, on the right bank of the Someșul Mare River.

At the 2011 census, Petru Rareș had a population of 3,351. According to the census, 53.21% of inhabitants are Romanians, 25.75% Roma, and 17.1% Hungarians.

Natives
Lajos Márk (1867–1942), Hungarian painter
 (1853–1905), Romanian teacher and writer

References

Communes in Bistrița-Năsăud County
Localities in Transylvania